Thomas Wedders, also known as Thomas Wadhouse, born in Yorkshire, England, circa 1730, was a performer in various circus sideshows in the mid-18th century. He is chiefly known for having the world's longest nose, allegedly measuring 7.8 inches (20 cm) long.

Beyond his unusual appearance, little is known about Wedders's life. Articles of the period remarked that he appeared to be intellectually disabled (referring to him as "an idiot") owing to an unknown condition, perhaps related to his unusual facial deformity.  He died around 1780 in Yorkshire, at either 50 or 52 years of age.

Guinness World Records gave him the posthumous title of "World's Largest Nose." A wax reproduction of his head is in the Ripley's Believe It or Not museum.

In 1896, The Strand Magazine elaborated:

"Thus, if noses were ever uniformly exact in representing the importance of the individual, this worthy ought to have amassed all the money in Thread needle Street and conquered all Europe, for this prodigious nose of his was a compound of the acquisitive and the martial. But either his chin was too weak or his brow too low, or Nature had so exhausted herself in the task of giving this prodigy a nose as to altogether forget to endow him with brains; or perhaps the nose crowded out this latter commodity. At all events, we are told this Yorkshireman expired, nose and all, as he had lived, in a condition of mind best described as the most abject idiocy."

References 

Entertainers from Yorkshire
British circus performers